Harlan Township is one of twenty townships in Fayette County, Iowa. As of the 2010 census, its population was 871.

Geography
According to the United States Census Bureau, Harlan Township covers an area of 36.79 square miles (95.28 square kilometers); of this, 36.76 square miles (95.22 square kilometers, 99.94 percent) is land and 0.03 square miles (0.07 square kilometers, 0.07 percent) is water.

Cities, towns, villages
 Maynard

Adjacent townships
 Center Township (north)
 Westfield Township (northeast)
 Smithfield Township (east)
 Scott Township (southeast)
 Jefferson Township (south)
 Oran Township (southwest)
 Fremont Township (west)
 Banks Township (northwest)

Cemeteries
The township contains these two cemeteries: Hope and Long Grove.

Major highways
  Iowa Highway 150

Landmarks
 City Park
 Twin Bridges County Park (east quarter)

School districts
 West Central Community School District

Political districts
 Iowa's 1st congressional district
 State House District 18
 State Senate District 9

References
 United States Census Bureau 2008 TIGER/Line Shapefiles
 United States Board on Geographic Names (GNIS)
 United States National Atlas

External links
 US-Counties.com
 City-Data.com

Townships in Fayette County, Iowa
Townships in Iowa